Gervase Bryan (c. 1622 – 27 December  1689) was an English clergyman, an ejected minister of 1662.

Gervase Bryan (also known as Jarvis or Jervis Brian) was educated at Emmanuel College, Cambridge, matriculating on 26 May 1640, graduating with BA (1643/44) and MA (1647).  He died at Coventry on 27 December 1689, being buried at Holy Trinity Church, Coventry, on 31 December 1689.  His son, Samuel (born 1652) at Oldswinford, Worcestershire also studied at Cambridge.

Bryan was installed as rector of St Mary's, Oldswinford in 1648 from where he was ejected in 1662.  He continued to live in the area being granted a licence to preach at his house in 1672.  He moved to Birmingham in 1675 and then, in 1676, succeeded his brother, John, as Presbyterian minister to a congregation meeting  in Coventry.  The liberty to meet in licensed rooms was withdrawn in 1682; but in 1687, after James II's declaration for liberty of conscience, ministers Obadiah Grew and Gervase Bryan reassembled their congregation in St. Nicholas Hall, commonly called Leather Hall.

References

1689 deaths
Ejected English ministers of 1662
Alumni of Emmanuel College, Cambridge
1622 births